Ryan Clark (born 22 September 1992) is an English former professional snooker player.

In May 2013, Clark qualified for the 2013–14 and 2014–15 professional Main Tour as one of four semi-finalists from the second Q School event.

Career

Debut season
Clark only won two matches during the 2013–14 season, and ended his first season on tour ranked world number 124.

2014/2015 season
Clark lost all six of his matches in the 2014–15 season, failing to win a frame in his last four. Having not played in an event since October 2014 when he lost 0–4 to Mark Joyce in the Bulgarian Open, Clark fell off the tour at the season's conclusion in 2015.

Performance and rankings timeline

References

External links

Ryan Clark at worldsnooker.com

English snooker players
Living people
1992 births
Sportspeople from Hartlepool